A. F. M. Entaz Ali (20 January 1937 – 26 January 1998) was a Bangladeshi lawyer and politician from Satkhira belonging to Bangladesh Awami League. He was a member of the Jatiya Sangsad.

Biography
Entaz Ali was born on 20 January 1937. He was involved in politics during his student life. After completing postgraduate studies from University of Dhaka he started his career as a lawyer. He was an organizer of the Liberation War of Bangladesh. He also took part in the Liberation War of Bangladesh. After the Liberation of Bangladesh he was elected as a member of the Jatiya Sangsad from Khulna-12 in 1973.

Entaz Ali died on 26 January 1998 at the age of 61.

References

1937 births
1998 deaths
1st Jatiya Sangsad members
People from Satkhira District
Awami League politicians
20th-century Bangladeshi lawyers
University of Dhaka alumni
People of the Bangladesh Liberation War